In differential geometry, a Nadirashvili surface is an immersed complete bounded minimal surface in R3 with negative curvature. This simultaneously answered  a question of Hadamard about whether there was an immersed complete bounded  surface in R3 with negative curvature, and a question of Eugenio Calabi and Shing-Tung Yau about whether there was an immersed complete bounded minimal surface in R3.

 showed that a complete immersed surface in R3 cannot have constant negative curvature, and  show that the curvature cannot be bounded above by a negative constant. So Nadirashvili's surface necessarily has points where the curvature is arbitrarily close to 0.

References

Differential geometry
Surfaces